was a Japanese samurai of the mid-Edo period, also known as Tayasu Munetake (田安 宗武). The first head of the Tayasu branch of the Tokugawa clan, he held daimyō-level income, but was not a daimyō himself, instead having his residence inside the Tayasu gate (Tayasu-mon 田安門) of Edo Castle. His child-hood name was Kojiro (小次郎). When his mother, Okon died in 1722, he was raised by Okume no Kata, one of Yoshimune's concubines.

Biography
He was the second son of the eighth shōgun Tokugawa Yoshimune with his concubine, Okon no Kata. Munetake was considered by some as the logical choice for heir, as he was both physically fit and also well-educated. However, Yoshimune preferred the route of primogeniture, instead selecting his son Ieshige as heir. Munetake subsequently turned his attention to writing and scholarship, and set the Tayasu house apart from the other two gosankyō houses by keeping it spartan. He had several sons who were brought up in this spartan environment, one of whom was the famed reformer Matsudaira Sadanobu. His wife was Morihime, daughter of Konoe Iehisa.

As a scholar, Munetake was a student of kokugaku. He studied under Kada no Arimaro and Kamo no Mabuchi, eventually producing the kokugaku texts Kokka hachiron yogen (国歌八論余言) and Tenkō-gon (天降言). He was also an accomplished poet.

As head of the prestigious Tayasu-Tokugawa house, Munetake held the court title of gon-chūnagon (権中納言) and the junior 3rd court rank (jusanmi 従三).

Family
Father: Tokugawa Yoshimune
Mother: Okon no Kata (d.1723) later Hontokuin
Adopted Mother: Okume no Kata later Kakuju-in (1697-1777)
Wife, concubine, children:
Wife: Konoe Moriko (1721-1786) later Horen-in
 Keijiro (1745-1753)
 Tokugawa Haruaki
 Makotohime (1741-1759) Date Shigemura's fiancée
 Yuhime (1743-1743)
 Tetsunosuke (1747-1752)
 Nakahime (1751-1779) married Ikeda Shigehiro
 Setsuhime (1756-1815) married Mori Haruchika
 Concubine: Oyama no Kata later Kaisen-in
 Shukuhime (1744-1815) married Nabeshima Shigeharu
 Matsudaira Sadanobu
 Matsudaira Sadakuni (1757-1804) inherited Iyo-Matsuyama Domain
 Mikuzumi (1747-1753)
 Tanehime (1765-1794) married Tokugawa Harutomi
 Sadahime (1767-1813) married Matsudaira Haruyoshi
 Concubine: Omori no Kata
 Otogiku (1752-1753)
 Concubine: Hayashi no Kata
 Osamuhime (1756-1820) married Sakai Tadanori

References
Concise biographical data (in Japanese)

1716 births
1771 deaths
Samurai
Tokugawa clan